Steve Sabella (born 19 May 1975 in Jerusalem) is a Berlin-based artist who uses photography and photographic installation as his principle modes of expression, and author of the memoir The Parachute Paradox, published by Kerber Verlag in 2016.

Sabella has shown his work internationally, at institutions and exhibitions such as Mathaf: Arab Museum of Modern Art, Rencontres d'Arles, Houston FotoFest, Arab World Institute, The Bumiller Collection Berlin, and the International Center for Photography Scavi Scaligeri, which hosted his first institutional retrospective in 2014. As a winner of the 2008 Ellen Auerbach prize, his first artist monograph Steve Sabella - Photography 1997-2014 was published by Hatje Cantz and the Akademie der Künste, Berlin in 2014.

Early career and education
Sabella first began studying at the Naggar School of Photography in Jerusalem, receiving a degree in Art Photography in 1997. In 2007, he received a BA in Visual Arts from the State University of New York.

While living in Jerusalem, Sabella worked as both an artist and commissioned photographer. Hired by the United Nations Development Programme, UNICEF, UNRWA and many other aid organizations, he was one of the few photographers with complete access to the West Bank, the Gaza Strip and Jerusalem during the Second Intifada, which had drastically limited the mobility of Palestinians. In 2005, he was listed as one of Pillars Magazine's most established brands in Palestine. The same year, Sabella and one of his colleagues were taken hostage in Gaza, abducted by the family of a Palestinian security officer kidnapped by the Palestinian National Authority. He was released unharmed, after several hours of holding.

In 2007, Sabella established the Palestine Photo Bank, an online image archive formed with the mission of promoting and supporting a positive picture of Palestine and its people.

Sabella moved from Palestine to London in 2007, and began to focus solely on his art career. He completed an MA in Photographic Studies from the University of Westminster in 2008, and an MA in Art Business from Sotheby's Institute of Art in 2009. In 2010, he moved to Berlin, where he is currently based.

Visual Art
Sabella has utilized large-scale photography, photographic collage, and mixed media in his visual practice. Irrespective of the method or medium, he considers his visual works as a form of research into the genealogy of the image. Rather than something that bears an indexical reference to the world, Sabella sees the photographic image as containing and producing its own form of reality. He has suggested that the creation of these alternate realities can be utilized politically, both as a means to foreclose or liberate the collective imagination—specifically in regards to Israel's occupation of Palestine.

Recurring themes in Sabella's work

Archaeology

Throughout his artistic practice, Sabella has created works concerned with the construction of visual history, investigating the role of the image in this process. He has often drawn parallels between his artwork and the field of archaeology, both in practice and theory: some of his photo-collages are partly composed by continuously removing layers of photographic visuals; other artworks have been printed on stones and paint fragments, appearing as ancient artifacts. Regarding the 38 Days of Re-Collection series, consisting of photographs printed on fragments of paint scraped from the walls of Jerusalem's Old City, the scholar Ella Shohat wrote, "Scraping thus becomes both an act of excavation of the buried substrata of forgotten lives, as well as a means to visualise lives once again intermingled."

Exile, the Palestinian experience & the colonization of the imagination
Critics of Sabella's work have often noted and discussed the themes of exile and the Palestinian experience. Artworks like Settlement - Six Israelis & One Palestinian and 38 Days of Re-Collection bear more explicit connotations of Sabella's birthplace in their content and media, but the themes of diaspora and occupation are also suggested by the titles of his series such as In Exile and Independence.

In 2014 Sabella stated, "All we need is the imagination to find who we are and what we are searching for. It is the responsibility of the individual to stand up and free him or herself from the new form of colonization that people are affected by yet are unaware of, the colonization of the imagination. Palestinians do not need the UN, the EU, the United States or any other country in the world, and especially not Israel, to declare to them that they are free. We are all born free. Every Palestinian should wake up today and say –– I am a free person."

In the artist's monograph, Hubertus von Amelunxen wrote, ”Steve Sabella is a Palestinian, born in Jerusalem in 1975 … Although he still has the privilege of being able to return, he chose exile, and art teaches him to grasp exile in its distorting and destructive consequences, which leads to an existence that is marked by a driven search and borders on disintegration. His art is an art of understanding; it is poetic and suppresses neither expulsion nor salvation. It keeps to the path and forms a bridge — it is the bridge.”

Experimentation of the photographic medium
Since the beginning of his artistic career, Sabella has experimented and played upon the traditions of the photographic medium: his 1997 series Search was shot on infrared film; Kan Yama Kan (2005) and Settlement - Six Israelis & One Palestinian (2008-2010) both reconfigure photographs to be viewed through installation; photographs in his works Till the End (1997) and 38 Days of Re-Collection (2014) are printed on stones and fragments of paint, respectively. Sabella's photo-collages such as Euphoria (2010) and Metamorphosis (2012) have elicited comparisons to the medium of painting; in this respect, the artist and historian Kamal Boullata has written, "Over the last decade [Sabella] has been using his camera as a painter uses his brush... A few decades ago, that is, long before globalization permeated all fields of cultural expression in our world, I wrote on the evolution of Palestinian painting following the country's national catastrophe in 1948. I documented how painters living at home or as refugees in the proximity of the homeland have universally employed a representational language of expression. The further away they lived, the more they engaged in abstraction. At the time, I never imagined such a phenomenon could possibly manifest itself in the field of photography."

Musicality

The variation in formal rhythm and tone in many of Sabella's photo-collages, as well as the theme running throughout his work of divergent voices being placed in dialogue, has prompted Hubertus von Amelunxen to relate musical concepts to his oeuvre. In Steve Sabella - Photography 1997-2014, von Amelunxen draws connections to notions of counterpoint, and writes specifically on Sabella's work Sinopia, which collages photographs of the skyline of Manama, Bahrain, "The city, photographed at dawn and during the day, is reflected along the central axis, the sea and sky indistinguishable from one another and the skyline, appearing out of the mist of dawn, retracting and then rising up again, reverberates at different pitches. Through visual reiteration, shadowy high-rises, a sound pattern emerges…" 

Sabella has also collaborated with musicians. In 2014, he commissioned the jazz ensemble The Khoury Project to interpret the visual form of his Sinopia skyline collage as a waveform, and create an electroacoustic composition that also sampled audio from locations in Bahrain.

Exhibitions

Solo exhibitions
From 1997 to the late 2000s, Sabella exhibited his work at various venues in Palestine. 2010 saw Sabella's first solo in Europe, Steve Sabella: In Exile at Metroquadro Gallery, Rivoli. Since then, notable solo exhibitions include Archaeology of the Future at the International Centre for Photography Scavi Scaligeri, Verona (2014); Fragments at Berloni Gallery, London (2014); Layers at Contemporary Art Platform, Kuwait (2014); Independence at Meem Gallery, Dubai (2014); and Fragments From Our Beautiful Future at The Bumiller Collection Berlin.

Group exhibitions
Sabella has shown work in group exhibitions including Gates of the Mediterranean at the Castello di Rivoli, Rivoli (2008, curated by Martina Corgnati); First Biennial of Photographers of the Contemporary Arab World at the Arab World Institute (IMA) and the Maison européenne de la photographie, Paris (2015, curated by Gabriel Bauret); Nel Mezzo del Mezzo at the Palazzo Riso, Palermo (2015, curated by Christine Macel); View From Inside at the FotoFest Biennial, Houston (2014, curated by Karin Adrian von Roques); and Keep Your Eye on the Wall at Les Rencontres d’Arles, Arles (2013, curated by MASASAM).

Selected art publications

Steve Sabella - Photography 1997-2014
The first monograph of the artist's work, Steve Sabella - Photography 1997-2014, was published by Hatje Cantz in collaboration with the Akademie der Künste, Berlin, in 2014. Its core texts are written by Hubertus von Amelunxen, with a foreword by Kamal Boullata. Hatje Cantz states that the book, "reads time and history out of the photographs and thus describes the genesis of Sabella’s photographic oeuvre under the aspects of exile, identity, migration, and the divided topologies of the 21st century."

Archaeology of the Future
Published by Maretti Editore for Sabella's 2014 retrospective of the same name at the International Center for Photography Scavi Scaligeri, Archaeology of the Future contains texts by Sabella, Karin Adrian von Roque, Beatrice Benedetti, and Leda Monsour, among others.

Fragments From Our Beautiful Future
Steve Sabella and Rebecca Raue's exhibition of the same name, shown at The Bumiller Collection, Berlin, was accompanied by a catalogue published by Kerber Verlag. The book included texts discussing the works of Sabella, Raue, and medieval Persian game pieces and mirrors included in the show from The Bumiller's Collection's archive; contributors included Hubertus von Amelunxen, Ella Shohat, T.J. Demos, Elliot R. Wolfson, and A.S. Bruckstein Çoruh.

Writing
In addition to his visual work, Sabella has developed a writing practice that continues to vary in style and format. His essays on the international art market and art-world dynamics first appeared in Contemporary Practices Art Journal, for which he was a regular contributor from 2008 to 2012.

The Parachute Paradox
Sabella's memoir The Parachute Paradox was published in a limited edition of 1,250 by Kerber Verlag in 2016. The book details Sabella's upbringing in Jerusalem under Israeli occupation, his subsequent nomadism, and the development of his art practice as a means of mental emancipation from the colonization of the imagination.

The Artist's Curse
On September 21, 2017, Sabella began publishing his new book project, The Artist's Curse. He has pledged to post online one new passage — or “curse” — every day for one year. The curses are numbered, short-form and modular prose pieces ranging from abstract and inspirational notions about the life of an artist, to detailing real-world practices of the global art market.

Recognition

Prizes and awards
For his visual art practice, Sabella has received a number of accolades, including Young Artist of the Year Award - A. M. Qattan Foundation in Palestine (2002), the Chevening Scholarship for MA in Photographic Studies from University of Westminster (2008), the Caparo Award of Distinction for MA in Photographic Studies from University of Westminster (2008), the Independent Photographers Terry O'Neil Award (2008, shortlisted and exhibited), the Ellen Auerbach Award - Akademie der Künste in Berlin (2008), and the Saïd Foundation Scholarship, which partially sponsored his studies for an MA in Art Business from Sotheby's Institute of Art (2009).

Documentaries and video interviews
Sabella has been the subject of a number of documentaries, including In The Darkroom with Steve Sabella by Nadia Johanne Kabalan (2014). He has also participated in film interviews for Deutsche Welle, France 24, Al Jazeera and Electronic Intifada.

Image gallery

See also
Akademie der Künste
Kamal Boullata
British Museum
List of University of Westminster alumni
Mathaf: Arab Museum of Modern Art
Palestinian art
TED (conference)

References

External links

Palestine Photo Bank
Metroquadroarte Gallery

Living people
Conceptual artists
Palestinian photographers
Alumni of the University of Westminster
Installation artists
1975 births
Palestinian contemporary artists